Ya'an (Tibetan: Yak-Nga ) is a prefecture-level city in the western part of Sichuan province, China, located just below the Tibetan Plateau. The city is home to Sichuan Agricultural University, the only 211 Project university and the largest regional comprehensive university in Ya'an. As of the 2020 Chinese census, Ya'an has a population of 1,434,603.

History

Previously known as Yazhou-fu, the city is first mentioned during the Zhou Dynasty (1122-255 BCE). It served as a county seat during the Qin and Han Dynasties, but was subsequently taken by nomadic tribes. After being reintegrated into the Chinese Empire in the late 5th century, it was made the seat of the Ya Prefecture in 604. The modern Ya'an county was established in 1912. It became the provincial capital of Xikang province in 1951, 
but has been a municipality under the administration of Sichuan province since 1955, when Xikang province was merged and became a part of Sichuan province.

The first giant panda was found in Baoxing County of Ya'an; Ya'an is also the origin of artificial planting tea of the world; Mengding Mountain in Mingshan County, has been keeping seven tea trees, which are believed to be the origins of tea, for more than 1,000 years.

Panda tea is also a local speciality.

On April 20, 2013, the city was hit by a major earthquake, causing numerous casualties and heavy damage to housing and infrastructure.

Geography

Ya'an is located at the western edge of the Sichuan Basin and on the upper reaches of the Yangtze, covering the transition between the Chengdu Plain and the Tibetan Plateau. Its latitude ranges from 28° 51′ 10″ — 30° 56′ 40″ N and its longitude from 101° 56′ 26″—103° 23′ 28″ E. Neighbouring prefectures are, starting from the northeast and moving counter-clockwise, Chengdu (NE), Meishan (E), Leshan (SE), Liangshan Yi Autonomous Prefecture (S), Garzê Tibetan Autonomous Prefecture (W), and Ngawa Tibetan and Qiang Autonomous Prefecture (N).
a population of 1,530,000,
 The city is encircled by mountains, and four rivers flow through it.

Climate
Ya'an has a monsoon-influenced humid subtropical climate (Köppen Cwa) and is largely mild and humid. The presence of the mountains to the northwest greatly affects the city's climate. In the short winters, they help shield the city from cold Siberian winds. January averages , and while frost may occur, snow is rare. Rainfall is common year-round, though in winter it tends to be light, and is particularly heavy in summer, when warm, humid southerly or southeasterly winds blow against the mountains, causing orographic lift to occur, enhancing rainfall. In addition, rain often falls at night, so fog is not a common occurrence.

Administrative subdivisions

Tourism and culture 

Tourism forms an important parts of the economy of Ya'an. The city is home to the Bifengxia Panda Base. The first panda specimen known to the western world was from Ya'an. 

The city is also famous for Ya fish, which is used in local cuisine. Ya'an is also the production base of Tibetan brick tea.

Transport 
China National Highway 318
G5 Beijing–Kunming Expressway
G4218 Yaye Expressway
G93 Chengyu Ring Expressway
Sichuan–Tibet railway Chengdu-Ya'an section
Ya'an railway station on the Sichuan–Tibet railway

See also
 Baoxing County
 Xikang

Notes

References
Encyclopædia Britannica, 15th ed., 2005
Forbes, Andrew ; Henley, David (2011). China's Ancient Tea Horse Road. Chiang Mai: Cognoscenti Books. ASIN: B005DQV7Q2

External links

Official website of Ya'an Government
National Geographic Magazine, Tea Horse Road

 
Cities in Sichuan
Prefecture-level divisions of Sichuan